Fasten Inc. is an American vehicle for hire company based in Boston, Massachusetts. Founded in 2015, it ceased U.S. operations in 2018 and was acquired by the Vezet Group.

History

Founded in 2015 by CEO Kirill Evdakov, CMO Roman Levitskiy and COO Vlad Christoff,  Fasten was first launched in September 2015 in Boston. In its initial round of funding, Fasten raised $9.2 million, contributed wholly by chairman Evgeny Lvov. Using the company's mobile app, customers can send requests for rides, which are then dispatched to the nearest available drivers. Fasten has emphasized that for every trip completed by a driver, the company only takes $0.99 of the fare, a lower commission compared to competing transportation businesses such as Uber and Lyft, which both take a percentage of the fare. In its first year, Fasten made a revenue of $500,000.

In its first year in Boston, Fasten mostly targeted college students in the Boston and Cambridge area. The company offered promotions such as $5 for any ride under 20 minutes, $3 off your first 100 rides, and free rides between midnight and 3am, with Fasten paying the difference between promotional prices and actual prices to drivers. To attract drivers, Fasten offered to pay drivers for not only the time the customer was in the car, but also for the distance and time covered when the driver was travelling to pick up their passenger. Evdakov stated that in its first year, Fasten's driver base in Boston "grew 300% quarter by quarter."

On March 2, 2018, the company announced to its riders and drivers that it would shut down all of its operations in the United States. Fasten has been acquired by Vezet Group, one of the top 10 ride-hailing companies in the world.

App 
In order to use Fasten, both riders and drivers need a GPS enabled smartphone with the app installed. Currently available in the Google Play store for Android devices, and from the App Store for devices powered by Apple's iOS.  From this app, riders can enter a start (usually their current location) and end destination, and can request either a four- or six-seat car. Before requesting, riders will see an estimated wait time, an estimated time until arrival at destination, and an estimated cost.  Instead of surge pricing in the app, Fasten offers potential riders the option to "boost" their ride, where riders can offer to pay drivers more in order to secure a ride during times of high demand. Upon requesting a ride, nearby drivers are notified of the pending request, and can choose whether or not to accept it. Drivers also see whether the rider has boosted the ride or not, and the multiplier of the booster.

Once a driver has accepted the request, the rider is able to view the driver's profile, including photo, the make and model of their car, license plate, and rating. Fasten rates drivers on a percentage scale, with riders giving drivers either thumbs up or down after each ride. Riders also see an estimated time until the driver arrives, with the driver's real-time position being shown on the map.

Customers have the option of contacting their driver through either phone or text. These communications are conducted through Fasten's servers, with Fasten providing both rider and driver with a temporary phone number to ensure anonymity. Fasten has emphasized that they require drivers to pull over before responding to phone calls or texts.

Another feature of the app is real-time pricing. While on the ride, riders can see the real-time fare they will be charged in the app as they travel along their route. This is similar to taxi cab pricing, and differs from Uber and Lyft, which offer either upfront pricing or calculate the fare to be paid after the trip has finished.

Driver fees 
Fasten takes a fixed $0.99 commission for every trip completed by a driver, unlike competitors Uber and Lyft, which both take around 20-30% of the fare riders pay. According to its website, Fasten drivers can also elect to pay a fixed $20 daily fee or $80 weekly fee, pocketing in whole all fares made during this period.

Drivers use their own cars, and must pay for their own fuel, car maintenance, and car insurance. During the ride, Fasten also offers additional and increasing levels of insurance coverage while a driver is looking for riders, while a driver is in transit to pick up a passenger, and while a passenger is on the ride, respectively.

Drivers must undergo rigorous background checks before being allowed to work for Fasten. The company reviews an applicants county and federal courthouse records, state criminal databases, national sex offender registry, social security history, and motor vehicle records. Evdakov also stated that Fasten requires drivers' cars to be manufactured later than 2005 for safety reasons.

References

External links 
 

Transport companies established in 2015
Ridesharing companies of the United States
American companies established in 2015
Privately held companies of the United States
Companies based in Boston